Quan Heng (Chinese: 权恒; born 30 September 1989 in Dalian) is a Chinese football player who currently plays for China League Two side Dandong Tengyue.

Club career
Quan Heng would start his football career playing for the various Dalian Shide F.C. youth teams before he was loaned out to the team's youth team called Dalian Shide Siwu FC that was allowed to take part in Singapore's 2008 S.League. Upon his return to Dalian Shide at the beginning of the 2009 Chinese Super League.
In February 2010, Quan transferred to Chinese Super League side Shenzhen Ruby. He would eventually make his league debut for Shenzhen on 28 May 2010 in a game against Jiangsu Sainty, coming on as a substitute for Huang Fengtao in the 77th minute.
In May 2011, Quan transferred to China League One side Dalian Aerbin.

On 31 December 2014, Quan transferred to China League Two side Dalian Transcendence.

In March 2019, Quan transferred to China League Two side Shenyang Urban. He would go on to win the 2019 China League Two division with the club.

Career statistics 
Statistics accurate as of match played 31 December 2020.

Honours

Club
Dalian Aerbin
China League One: 2011

Shenyang Urban
 China League Two: 2019

References

External links
 

1989 births
Living people
Chinese footballers
Footballers from Dalian
Dalian Shide F.C. players
Shenzhen F.C. players
Dalian Professional F.C. players
Dalian Transcendence F.C. players
Liaoning Shenyang Urban F.C. players
Chinese Super League players
China League One players
China League Two players
Singapore Premier League players
Association football midfielders